The breakup of Yugoslavia was a process in which the Socialist Federal Republic of Yugoslavia was broken up into constituent republics, and over the course of which the Yugoslav wars started. The process generally began with the death of Josip Broz Tito on 4 May 1980 and formally ended when the last two remaining republics (SR Serbia and SR Montenegro) proclaimed the Federal Republic of Yugoslavia on 27 April 1992. At that time the Yugoslav wars were still ongoing, and FR Yugoslavia continued to exist until 2003, when it was renamed and reformed as the state union of Serbia and Montenegro. This union lasted until 5 June 2006 when Montenegro proclaimed independence. The former Yugoslav autonomous province of Kosovo subsequently proclaimed independence from Serbia in February 2008.

SFR Yugoslavia

1980

1981

1982

1983

1984

1985

1986

1987

1988

1989

1990

1991

1992

FR Yugoslavia

1992

1993

1994

1995

1999

2000

2001

2006

2008

See also
Timeline of the Croatian War of Independence
Timeline of the Yugoslav wars
 Independence of Kosovo

References

Bibliography
 
 

Politics of Yugoslavia
Yugoslav breakup
Breakup of Yugoslavia
Yugoslavia